Thomas Jefferson (April 13, 1743 – July 4, 1826) was an American statesman, diplomat, lawyer, architect, philosopher, and Founding Father who served as the third president of the United States from 1801 to 1809. Among the Committee of Five charged by the Second Continental Congress with authoring the Declaration of Independence, Jefferson was the Declaration's primary author, writing it between June 11 and June 28, 1776 at a three-story residence at 700 Market Street in Philadelphia. Following the American Revolutionary War and prior to becoming the nation's third president in 1801, Jefferson was the first United States secretary of state under George Washington and then the nation's second vice president under John Adams. 

Among the nation's Founding Fathers, Jefferson is considered unmatched in his intellectual depth and breadth. His passionate writings and advocacy for human rights, including freedom of thought, speech, and religion, were a leading inspiration behind the American Revolution, which ultimately gave rise to the American Revolutionary War, American independence, and the United States Constitution. Globally, Jefferson's ideas were influential in shaping and inspiring the Age of Enlightenment, which proved transformational globally in the late 17th and 18th centuries. He was a leading proponent of democracy, republicanism, and individual rights, and produced formative documents and decisions at state, national, and international levels. 

During the American Revolution, Jefferson represented Virginia in the Second Continental Congress, which adopted the Declaration of Independence on July 4, 1776. As a Virginia legislator, he drafted a state law for religious freedom. He served as the second Governor of Virginia from 1779 to 1781, during the Revolutionary War. In 1785, Jefferson was appointed the United States Minister to France, and subsequently, the nation's first secretary of state under President George Washington from 1790 to 1793. Jefferson and James Madison organized the Democratic-Republican Party to oppose the Federalist Party during the formation of the First Party System. With Madison, he anonymously wrote the Kentucky and Virginia Resolutions in 1798 and 1799, which sought to strengthen states' rights by nullifying the federal Alien and Sedition Acts.

Jefferson and Federalist John Adams became friends as well as political rivals, serving in the Continental Congress and drafting the Declaration of Independence together. In the 1796 presidential election between the two, Jefferson came in second, which according to electoral procedure at the time, made him vice president to Adams. Jefferson challenged Adams again in 1800 and won the presidency. After his term in office, Jefferson eventually reconciled with Adams and they shared a correspondence that lasted fourteen years.

As president, Jefferson pursued the nation's shipping and trade interests against Barbary pirates and aggressive British trade policies. Starting in 1803, he promoted a western expansionist policy with the Louisiana Purchase which doubled the nation's claimed land area. To make room for settlement, Jefferson began the process of Indian tribal removal from the newly acquired territory. As a result of peace negotiations with France, his administration reduced military forces. He was re-elected in 1804, but his second term was beset with difficulties at home, including the trial of former vice president Aaron Burr. In 1807, American foreign trade was diminished when Jefferson implemented the Embargo Act in response to British threats to U.S. shipping. The same year, Jefferson signed the Act Prohibiting Importation of Slaves.

Jefferson was a plantation owner, lawyer, and politician, and mastered many disciplines including surveying, mathematics, horticulture, and mechanics. He was also an architect in the Palladian tradition. Jefferson's keen interest in religion and philosophy led to his appointment as president of the American Philosophical Society. He largely shunned organized religion but was influenced by Christianity, Epicureanism, and deism. Jefferson rejected fundamental Christianity, denying Christ's divinity. A philologist, Jefferson knew several languages. He was a prolific letter writer and corresponded with many prominent people, including Edward Carrington, John Taylor of Caroline, and James Madison. In 1785, Jefferson authored Notes on the State of Virginia, considered perhaps the most important American book published before 1800. Jefferson championed the ideals, values, and teachings of the Enlightenment.

Since the 1790s, Jefferson was rumored to have had children by his sister-in-law and slave Sally Hemings, known as the Jefferson-Hemings controversy. A 1998 DNA test concluded that one of Sally Hemings's children, Eston Hemings, was of the Jefferson male line. According to scholarly consensus, based on documentary and statistical evaluation, as well as oral history, Jefferson probably fathered at least six children with Hemings, including four that survived to adulthood.

After retiring from public office, Jefferson founded the University of Virginia. He and John Adams both died on the same day, July 4, 1826, which was also the 50th anniversary of U.S. independence. Presidential scholars and historians generally praise Jefferson's public achievements, including his advocacy of religious freedom and tolerance in Virginia, his peaceful acquisition of the Louisiana Territory from France without war or controversy, and his ambitious and successful Lewis and Clark Expedition. Some modern historians are critical of Jefferson's personal involvement with slavery. Jefferson is consistently ranked among the top ten presidents of American history.

Early life and career

Thomas Jefferson was born on April 13, 1743 (April 2, 1743, Old Style, Julian calendar), at the family's Shadwell Plantation in the British Colony of Virginia, the third of ten children. He was of English, and possibly Welsh, descent and was born a British subject. His father Peter Jefferson was a planter and surveyor who died when Jefferson was fourteen; his mother was Jane Randolph. Peter Jefferson moved his family to Tuckahoe Plantation in 1745 upon the death of William Randolph III, the plantation's owner and Jefferson's friend, who in his will had named Peter guardian of Randolph's children. The Jeffersons returned to Shadwell in 1752, where Peter died in 1757; his estate was divided between his sons Thomas and Randolph. John Harvie Sr. then became Thomas' guardian. In 1753 he attended the wedding of his uncle Field Jefferson to Mary Allen Hunt, who became a close friend and early mentor.

Education and early family life

Jefferson began his education together with the Randolph children by tutors at Tuckahoe. Thomas' father Peter was self-taught, regretted not having a formal education, and entered Thomas into an English school at age five. In 1752, at age nine, he attended a local school run by a Scottish Presbyterian minister and also began studying the natural world, which he grew to love. At this time he began studying Latin, Greek, and French, while also learning to ride horses. Thomas also read books from his father's modest library. He was taught from 1758 to 1760 by the Reverend James Maury near Gordonsville, Virginia, where he studied history, science, and the classics while boarding with Maury's family. Jefferson then came to know and befriended various American Indians, including the famous Cherokee chief Ostenaco, who often stopped at Shadwell to visit on their way to Williamsburg to trade. During the two years Jefferson was with the Maury family, he traveled to Williamsburg and was a guest of Colonel John Dandridge, father of Martha Washington. In Williamsburg the young Jefferson met and came to admire Patrick Henry, eight years his senior, and shared a common interest in violin playing.

Jefferson entered the College of William & Mary in Williamsburg, Virginia at age 16 and studied mathematics, metaphysics, and philosophy with Professor William Small. Under Small's tutelage, Jefferson encountered the ideas of the British Empiricists, including John Locke, Francis Bacon, and Isaac Newton. Small introduced Jefferson to George Wythe and Francis Fauquier. Small, Wythe, and Fauquier recognized Jefferson as a man of exceptional ability and included him in their inner circle, where he became a regular member of their Friday dinner parties where politics and philosophy were discussed. Jefferson later wrote that, while there, he "heard more common good sense, more rational & philosophical conversations than in all the rest of my life". During his first year at the college he was given more to parties and dancing and was not very frugal with his expenditures; in his second year, regretting that he had squandered away much time and money, he dedicated himself to fifteen hours of study a day. Jefferson improved his French and Greek and his skill at the violin. He graduated two years after starting in 1762. He read the law under Wythe's tutelage to obtain his law license while working as a law clerk in his office. He also read a wide variety of English classics and political works. Jefferson was well-read in a broad variety of subjects, which along with law and philosophy, included history, natural law, natural religion, ethics, and several areas in science, including agriculture. Overall, he drew very deeply on the philosophers. During the years of study under the watchful eye of Wythe, Jefferson authored a survey of his extensive readings in his Commonplace Book. Wythe was so impressed with Jefferson that he later bequeathed his entire library to him.

The year 1765 was an eventful one in Jefferson's family. In July, his sister Martha married his close friend and college companion Dabney Carr, which greatly pleased Jefferson. In October, he mourned his sister Jane's unexpected death at age 25 and wrote a farewell epitaph in Latin. Jefferson treasured his books and amassed three libraries in his lifetime. The first, a library of 200 volumes started in his youth which included books inherited from his father and left to him by George Wythe, was destroyed when his Shadwell home burned in a 1770 fire. Nevertheless, he had replenished his collection with 1,250 titles by 1773, and it grew to almost 6,500 volumes by 1814. He organized his wide variety of books into three broad categories corresponding with elements of the human mind: memory, reason, and imagination. After the British burned the Library of Congress during the Burning of Washington, he sold this second library to the U.S. government to jumpstart the Library of Congress collection, for the price of $23,950. Jefferson used a portion of the money secured by the sale to pay off some of his large debt, remitting $10,500 to William Short and $4,870 to John Barnes of Georgetown. However, he soon resumed collecting for his personal library, writing to John Adams, "I cannot live without books." He began to construct a new library of his personal favorites and by the time of his death a decade later it had grown to almost 2,000 volumes.

Lawyer and House of Burgesses

Jefferson was admitted to the Virginia bar in 1767, and lived with his mother at Shadwell. He represented Albemarle County as a delegate in the Virginia House of Burgesses from 1769 until 1775. He pursued reforms to slavery, with legislation in 1769 to give masters control over the emancipation of slaves, taking discretion away from the royal governor and General Court. He persuaded his cousin Richard Bland to spearhead the legislation's passage, but opposition was strong.

Jefferson took seven cases for freedom-seeking slaves and waived his fee for one who claimed that he should be freed before his minimum statutory age. Jefferson invoked natural law to argue, "everyone comes into the world with a right to his own person and using it at his own will ... This is what is called personal liberty, and is given him by the author of nature, because it is necessary for his own sustenance." The judge cut him off and ruled against his client. As a consolation, Jefferson gave his client some money, conceivably used to aid his escape shortly thereafter. He later incorporated this sentiment into the Declaration of Independence. He also took on 68 cases for the General Court of Virginia in 1767, in addition to three notable cases: Howell v. Netherland (1770), Bolling v. Bolling (1771), and Blair v. Blair (1772).

The British Parliament passed the Intolerable Acts in 1774, and Jefferson wrote a resolution calling for a "Day of Fasting and Prayer" in protest, as well as a boycott of all British goods. His resolution was later expanded into A Summary View of the Rights of British America, in which he argued that people have the right to govern themselves.

Monticello, marriage, and family

In 1768, Jefferson began constructing his primary residence Monticello (Italian for "Little Mountain") on a hilltop overlooking his  plantation. He spent most of his adult life designing Monticello as architect and was quoted as saying, "Architecture is my delight, and putting up, and pulling down, one of my favorite amusements." Construction was done mostly by local masons and carpenters, assisted by Jefferson's slaves.

He moved into the South Pavilion in 1770. Turning Monticello into a neoclassical masterpiece in the Palladian style was his perennial project. On January 1, 1772, Jefferson married his third cousin Martha Wayles Skelton, the 23-year-old widow of Bathurst Skelton, and she moved into the South Pavilion. She was a frequent hostess for Jefferson and managed the large household. Biographer Dumas Malone described the  marriage as the happiest period of Jefferson's life. Martha read widely, did fine needlework, and was a skilled pianist; Jefferson often accompanied her on the violin or cello. During their ten years of marriage, Martha bore six children: Martha "Patsy" (1772–1836); Jane (1774–1775); an unnamed son who lived for only a few weeks in 1777; Mary "Polly" (1778–1804); Lucy Elizabeth (1780–1781); and another Lucy Elizabeth (1782–1784). Only Martha and Mary survived to adulthood. 
 Martha's father John Wayles died in 1773, and the couple inherited 135 slaves, and the estate's debts. The debts took Jefferson years to satisfy, contributing to his financial problems.

Martha later suffered from ill health, including diabetes, and frequent childbirth further weakened her. Her mother had died young, and Martha lived with two stepmothers as a girl. A few months after the birth of her last child, she died on September 6, 1782, with Jefferson at her bedside. Shortly before her death, Martha made Jefferson promise never to marry again, telling him that she could not bear to have another mother raise her children. Jefferson was grief-stricken by her death, relentlessly pacing back and forth, nearly to the point of exhaustion. He emerged after three weeks, taking long rambling rides on secluded roads with his daughter Martha, by her description "a solitary witness to many a violent burst of grief".

After working as secretary of state (1790–1793), he returned to Monticello and initiated a remodeling based on the architectural concepts which he had acquired in Europe. The work continued throughout most of his presidency and was completed in 1809.

Revolutionary War

Declaration of Independence

Jefferson was the primary author of the Declaration of Independence. The document's social and political ideals were proposed by Jefferson before the inauguration of Washington. At age 33, he was one of the youngest delegates to the Second Continental Congress beginning in 1775 at the outbreak of the American Revolutionary War, where a formal declaration of independence from Britain was overwhelmingly favored. Jefferson chose his words for the Declaration in June 1775, shortly after the war had begun; the idea of independence from Britain had long since become popular among the colonies. He was inspired by the Enlightenment ideals of the sanctity of the individual, as well as the writings of Locke and Montesquieu.

He sought out John Adams, an emerging leader of the Congress. They became close friends and Adams supported Jefferson's appointment to the Committee of Five formed to draft a declaration of independence in furtherance of the Lee Resolution passed by the Congress, which declared the United Colonies independent. The committee initially thought that Adams should write the document, but Adams persuaded the committee to choose Jefferson.

Jefferson consulted with other committee members over the next seventeen days and drew on his proposed draft of the Virginia Constitution, George Mason's draft of the Virginia Declaration of Rights, and other sources. The other committee members made some changes, and a final draft was presented to Congress on June 28, 1776.

The declaration was introduced on Friday, June 28, and Congress began debate over its contents on Monday, July 1, resulting in the omission of a fourth of the text, including a passage critical of King George III and "Jefferson's anti-slavery clause". Jefferson resented the changes, but he did not speak publicly about the revisions. On July 4, 1776, the Congress ratified the Declaration, and delegates signed it on August 2; in doing so, they were committing an act of treason against the Crown. Jefferson's preamble is regarded as an enduring statement of human rights, and the phrase "all men are created equal" has been called "one of the best-known sentences in the English language" containing "the most potent and consequential words in American history".

Virginia state legislator and governor

At the start of the Revolution, Colonel Jefferson was named commander of the Albemarle County Militia on September 26, 1775. He was then elected to the Virginia House of Delegates for Albemarle County in September 1776, when finalizing the state constitution was a priority.
For nearly three years, he assisted with the constitution and was especially proud of his Bill for Establishing Religious Freedom, which prohibited state support of religious institutions or enforcement of religious doctrine. The bill failed to pass, as did his legislation to disestablish the Anglican Church, but both were later revived by James Madison.

In 1778, Jefferson was given the task of revising the state's laws. He drafted 126 bills in three years, including laws to streamline the judicial system. He proposed statutes that provided for general education, which he considered the basis of "republican government". Jefferson also was concerned that Virginia's powerful landed gentry were becoming a hereditary aristocracy and he took the lead in abolishing what he called "feudal and unnatural distinctions." He targeted laws such as entail and primogeniture by which a deceased landowner's oldest son was vested with all land ownership and power. 

Jefferson was elected governor for one-year terms in 1779 and 1780. He transferred the state capital from Williamsburg to Richmond, and introduced additional measures for public education, religious freedom, and inheritance.

During General Benedict Arnold's 1781 invasion of Virginia, Jefferson escaped Richmond just ahead of the British forces, which razed the city. He sent emergency dispatches to Colonel Sampson Mathews and other commanders in an attempt to repel Arnold's efforts. Jefferson then visited with friends in the surrounding counties of Richmond, including William Fleming, a college friend of his in Chesterfield County. General Charles Cornwallis that spring dispatched a cavalry force led by Banastre Tarleton to capture Jefferson and members of the Assembly at Monticello, but Jack Jouett of the Virginia militia thwarted the British plan. Jefferson escaped to Poplar Forest, his plantation to the west. When the General Assembly reconvened in June 1781, it conducted an inquiry into Jefferson's actions which eventually concluded that Jefferson had acted with honor—but he was not re-elected.

In April of the same year, his daughter Lucy died at age one. A second daughter of that name was born the following year, but she died at age three.

In 1782, Jefferson refused a partnership offer by North Carolina Governor Abner Nash, in a profiteering scheme involving the sale of confiscated Loyalist lands. Unlike some Founders in pursuit of land, Jefferson was content with his Monticello estate and the land he owned in the vicinity of Virginia's Shenandoah Valley. Jefferson thought of Monticello as an intellectual gathering place for his friends James Madison and James Monroe.

Notes on the State of Virginia

In 1780, Jefferson received from French diplomat François Barbé-Marbois a letter of inquiry into the geography, history, and government of Virginia, as part of a study of the United States. Jefferson organized his responses in a book, Notes on the State of Virginia (1785). He compiled the book over five years, including reviews of scientific knowledge, Virginia's history, politics, laws, culture, and geography. The book explores what constitutes a good society, using Virginia as an exemplar. Jefferson included extensive data about the state's natural resources and economy and wrote at length about slavery and miscegenation; he articulated his belief that blacks and whites could not live together as free people in one society because of justified resentments of the enslaved. He also wrote of his views on the American Indian, equating them to European settlers in body and mind.

Notes was first published in 1785 in French and appeared in English in 1787. Biographer George Tucker considered the work "surprising in the extent of the information which a single individual had been thus far able to acquire, as to the physical features of the state"; Merrill D. Peterson described it as an accomplishment for which all Americans should be grateful.

Member of Congress

The United States formed a Congress of the Confederation following victory in the Revolutionary War and a peace treaty with Great Britain in 1783, to which Jefferson was appointed as a Virginia delegate. He was a member of the committee setting foreign exchange rates and recommended an American currency based on the decimal system which was adopted. He advised the formation of the Committee of the States to fill the power vacuum when Congress was in recess. The Committee met when Congress adjourned, but disagreements rendered it dysfunctional.

In the Congress's 1783–1784 session, Jefferson acted as chairman of committees to establish a viable system of government for the new Republic and to propose a policy for the settlement of the western territories. He was the principal author of the Land Ordinance of 1784, whereby Virginia ceded to the national government the vast area that it claimed northwest of the Ohio River. He insisted that this territory should not be used as colonial territory by any of the thirteen states, but that it should be divided into sections that could become states. He plotted borders for nine new states in their initial stages and wrote an ordinance banning slavery in all the nation's territories. Congress made extensive revisions, and rejected the ban on slavery. The provisions banning slavery, known as the "Jefferson Proviso," were modified and implemented three years later in the Northwest Ordinance of 1787 and became the law for the entire Northwest.

Minister to France

On May 7, 1784, Jefferson was appointed by the Congress of the Confederation to join Benjamin Franklin and John Adams in Paris as Minister Plenipotentiary for Negotiating Treaties of Amity and Commerce with Great Britain and other countries. With his young daughter Patsy and two servants, he departed in July 1784, arriving in Paris the next month. Jefferson had Patsy educated at the Pentemont Abbey. Less than a year later he was assigned the additional duty of succeeding Franklin as Minister to France. French foreign minister Count de Vergennes commented, "You replace Monsieur Franklin, I hear." Jefferson replied, "I succeed. No man can replace him." During his five years in Paris, Jefferson played a leading role in shaping U.S. foreign policy.

In 1786, he met and fell in love with Maria Cosway, an accomplished—and married—Italian-English musician of 27. They saw each other frequently over a period of six weeks. She returned to Great Britain, but they maintained a lifelong correspondence.

During the summer of 1786, Jefferson arrived in London to meet with John Adams, the United States Ambassador to Britain. Adams had official access to George III and arranged a meeting between Jefferson and the king. Jefferson later described the king's reception of the men as "ungracious." According to Adams's grandson, George III turned his back on both Adams and Jefferson in a jesture of public insult. Jefferson returned to France in August.

Jefferson sent for his youngest surviving child, nine-year-old Polly, in June 1787, who was accompanied on her voyage by a young slave from Monticello, Sally Hemings. He had taken her older brother James Hemings to Paris as part of his domestic staff and had him trained in French cuisine. According to Sally's son, Madison Hemings, the 16-year-old Sally and Jefferson began a sexual relationship in Paris, where she became pregnant. The son also indicated Hemings agreed to return to the United States only after Jefferson promised to free her children when they came of age.

While in France, Jefferson became a regular companion of the Marquis de Lafayette, a French hero of the American Revolutionary War, and Jefferson used his influence to procure trade agreements with France. As the French Revolution began, he allowed his Paris residence, the Hôtel de Langeac, to be used for meetings by Lafayette and other republicans. He was in Paris during the storming of the Bastille and consulted with Lafayette while the latter drafted the Declaration of the Rights of Man and of the Citizen. Jefferson often found his mail opened by postmasters, so he invented his own enciphering device, the "Wheel Cipher"; he wrote important communications in code for the rest of his career. Unable to attend the 1787 Convention, Jefferson supported the Constitution but desired the addition of the promised bill of rights. Jefferson left Paris for America in September 1789, intending to return to his home soon; however, President George Washington appointed him the country's first secretary of state, forcing him to remain in the nation's capital. Jefferson remained a firm supporter of the French Revolution while opposing its more violent elements. John Skey Eustace kept  Jefferson informed of the events of the French Revolution.

Secretary of State

Soon after returning from France, Jefferson accepted Washington's invitation to serve as secretary of state. Pressing issues at this time were the national debt and the permanent location of the capital. He opposed a national debt, preferring that each state retire its own, in contrast to Secretary of the Treasury Alexander Hamilton, who desired consolidation of various states' debts by the federal government. Hamilton also had bold plans to establish the national credit and a national bank, but Jefferson strenuously opposed this and attempted to undermine his agenda, which nearly led Washington to dismiss him from his cabinet. He later left the cabinet voluntarily.

Jefferson's goals were to decrease American dependence on British commerce and to expand commercial trade with France. He sought to weaken Spanish colonialism of the trans-Appalachian West and British control in the North, believing this would aid in the pacification of Native Americans.

The second major issue was the capital's permanent location. Hamilton favored a capital close to the major commercial centers of the Northeast, while Washington, Jefferson, and other agrarians wanted it located to the south. After lengthy deadlock, the Compromise of 1790 was struck, permanently locating the capital on the Potomac River, and the federal government assumed the war debts of all thirteen states.

While serving in the government in Philadelphia, Jefferson and political protegee Congressman James Madison founded the National Gazette in 1791, along with author Phillip Freneau, in an effort to counter Hamilton's Federalist policies, which Hamilton was promoting through the influential Federalist newspaper the Gazette of the United States. The National Gazette made particular criticism of the policies promoted by Hamilton, often through anonymous essays signed by the pen name Brutus at Jefferson's urging, which were actually written by Madison. In the Spring of 1791, Jefferson and Madison took a vacation to Vermont. Jefferson had been suffering from migraines and he was tired of Hamilton in-fighting.

In May 1792, Jefferson was alarmed at the political rivalries taking shape; he wrote to Washington, imploring him to run for re-election that year as a unifying influence. He urged the president to rally the citizenry to a party that would defend democracy against the corrupting influence of banks and monied interests, as espoused by the Federalists. Historians recognize this letter as the earliest delineation of Democratic-Republican Party principles. Jefferson, Madison, and other Democratic-Republican organizers favored states' rights and local control and opposed federal concentration of power, whereas Hamilton sought more power for the federal government.

Jefferson supported France against Britain when the two nations fought in 1793, though his arguments in the Cabinet were undercut by French Revolutionary envoy Edmond-Charles Genêt's open scorn for President Washington. In his discussions with British Minister George Hammond, he tried in vain to persuade the British to vacate their posts in the Northwest and to compensate the U.S. for slaves whom the British had freed at the end of the war. Jefferson sought a return to private life, and resigned the cabinet position in December 1793; he may also have wanted to bolster his political influence from outside the administration.

After the Washington administration negotiated the Jay Treaty with Great Britain (1794), Jefferson saw a cause around which to rally his party and organized a national opposition from Monticello. The treaty, designed by Hamilton, aimed to reduce tensions and increase trade. Jefferson warned that it would increase British influence and subvert republicanism, calling it "the boldest act [Hamilton and Jay] ever ventured on to undermine the government". The Treaty passed, but it expired in 1805 during Jefferson's administration and was not renewed. Jefferson continued his pro-French stance; during the violence of the Reign of Terror, he declined to disavow the revolution: "To back away from France would be to undermine the cause of republicanism in America."

Election of 1796 and vice presidency

In the presidential campaign of 1796, Jefferson lost the electoral college vote to Federalist John Adams by 71–68 and was thus elected vice president. As presiding officer of the Senate, he assumed a more passive role than his predecessor John Adams. He allowed the Senate to freely conduct debates and confined his participation to procedural issues, which he called an "honorable and easy" role. Jefferson had previously studied parliamentary law and procedure for 40 years, making him quite qualified to serve as presiding officer. In 1800, he published his assembled notes on Senate procedure as A Manual of Parliamentary Practice. He cast only three tie-breaking votes in the Senate.

In four confidential talks with French consul Joseph Létombe in the spring of 1797, Jefferson attacked Adams and predicted that his rival would serve only one term. He also encouraged France to invade England, and advised Létombe to stall any American envoys sent to Paris by instructing him to "listen to them and then drag out the negotiations at length and mollify them by the urbanity of the proceedings." This toughened the tone that the French government adopted toward the Adams administration. After Adams's initial peace envoys were rebuffed, Jefferson and his supporters lobbied for the release of papers related to the incident, called the XYZ Affair after the letters used to disguise the identities of the French officials involved. However, the tactic backfired when it was revealed that French officials had demanded bribes, rallying public support against France. The U.S. began an undeclared naval war with France known as the Quasi-War.

During the Adams presidency, the Federalists rebuilt the military, levied new taxes, and enacted the Alien and Sedition Acts. Jefferson believed these laws were intended to suppress Democratic-Republicans, rather than prosecute enemy aliens, and considered them unconstitutional. To rally opposition, he and James Madison anonymously wrote the Kentucky and Virginia Resolutions, declaring that the federal government had no right to exercise powers not specifically delegated to it by the states. The resolutions followed the "interposition" approach of Madison, in which states may shield their citizens from federal laws that they deem unconstitutional. Jefferson advocated nullification, allowing states to invalidate federal laws altogether. He warned that, "unless arrested at the threshold", the Alien and Sedition Acts would "necessarily drive these states into revolution and blood".

Historian Ron Chernow claims that "the theoretical damage of the Kentucky and Virginia Resolutions was deep and lasting, and was a recipe for disunion", contributing to the American Civil War as well as later events. Washington was so appalled by the resolutions that he told Patrick Henry that, if "systematically and pertinaciously pursued", the resolutions would "dissolve the union or produce coercion." Jefferson had always admired Washington's leadership skills but felt that his Federalist party was leading the country in the wrong direction. He decided not to attend Washington's funeral in 1799 because of acute differences with him while serving as secretary of state.

Election of 1800

Jefferson contended for president once more against Adams in 1800. Adams's campaign was weakened by unpopular taxes and vicious Federalist infighting over his actions in the Quasi-War. Democratic-Republicans pointed to the Alien and Sedition Acts and accused the Federalists of being secret pro-Britain monarchists, while Federalists charged that Jefferson was a godless libertine beholden to the French. Historian Joyce Appleby said the election was "one of the most acrimonious in the annals of American history".

The Democratic-Republicans ultimately won more electoral college votes, due in part to the electors that resulted from the addition of three-fifths of the South's slaves to the population calculation. Jefferson and his vice-presidential candidate Aaron Burr unexpectedly received an equal total. Because of the tie, the election was decided by the Federalist-dominated House of Representatives. Hamilton lobbied Federalist representatives on Jefferson's behalf, believing him a lesser political evil than Burr. On February 17, 1801, after thirty-six ballots, the House elected Jefferson president and Burr vice president. Jefferson became the second incumbent vice president to be elected president.

The win was marked by Democratic-Republican celebrations throughout the country. Some of Jefferson's opponents argued that he owed his victory over Adams to the South's inflated number of electors, due to the counting slaves under the Three-Fifths Compromise. Others alleged that Jefferson secured James Asheton Bayard's tie-breaking electoral vote by guaranteeing the retention of various Federalist posts in the government. Jefferson disputed the allegation, and the historical record is inconclusive.

The transition proceeded smoothly, marking a watershed in American history. As historian Gordon S. Wood writes, "it was one of the first popular elections in modern history that resulted in the peaceful transfer of power from one 'party' to another."

Presidency (1801–1809)

Jefferson was sworn in by Chief Justice John Marshall at the new Capitol in Washington, D.C. on March 4, 1801. His inauguration was not attended by outgoing President Adams. In contrast to his predecessors, Jefferson exhibited a dislike of formal etiquette. Plainly dressed, he arrived alone, and walked to the Capitol with his friends. His inaugural address struck a note of reconciliation and commitment to democratic ideology, declaring, "We have been called by different names brethren of the same principle. We are all Republicans, we are all Federalists." Ideologically, he stressed "equal and exact justice to all men", minority rights, and freedom of speech, religion, and press. He said that a free and democratic government was "the strongest government on earth." He nominated moderate Republicans to his cabinet: James Madison as secretary of state, Henry Dearborn as secretary of war, Levi Lincoln as attorney general, and Robert Smith as secretary of the navy.

Widowed since 1782, Jefferson first used his two daughters as hostesses. Starting in late May, 1801, he asked Dolley Madison, wife of his long-time friend James Madison, to be the permanent White House hostess. She accepted, realizing the diplomatic importance of the position. She was also in charge of the completion of the White House mansion. Dolley served as White House hostess for the rest of Jefferson's two terms and then eight more years as First Lady to President James Madison.

Financial affairs

Jefferson's first official challenge was the $83 million national debt. He began dismantling Hamilton's Federalist fiscal system with help from the Secretary of the Treasury Albert Gallatin. Gallatin devised a plan to eliminate the national debt in sixteen years by extensive annual appropriations and reduction in taxes. The administration eliminated the whiskey excise and other taxes after closing "unnecessary offices" and cutting "useless establishments and expenses".

Jefferson believed that the First Bank of the United States represented a "most deadly hostility" to republican government. He wanted to dismantle the bank before its charter expired in 1811, but was dissuaded by Gallatin. Gallatin argued that the national bank was a useful financial institution and set out to expand its operations. Jefferson looked to other corners to address the growing national debt. He shrank the Navy, for example, deeming it unnecessary in peacetime, and incorporated a fleet of inexpensive gunboats intended only for local defense to avoid provocation against foreign powers. After two terms, he had lowered the national debt from $83 million to $57 million.

Domestic affairs
Jefferson pardoned several of those imprisoned under the Alien and Sedition Acts. Congressional Republicans repealed the Judiciary Act of 1801, which removed nearly all of Adams's "midnight judges" from office. A subsequent appointment battle led to the Supreme Court's landmark decision in Marbury v. Madison, asserting judicial review over executive branch actions. Jefferson appointed three Supreme Court justices: William Johnson (1804), Henry Brockholst Livingston (1807), and Thomas Todd (1807).

Jefferson strongly felt the need for a national military university, producing an officer engineering corps for a national defense based on the advancement of the sciences, rather than having to rely on foreign sources for top grade engineers with questionable loyalty. He signed the Military Peace Establishment Act on March 16, 1802, thus founding the United States Military Academy at West Point. The Act documented in 29 sections a new set of laws and limits for the military. Jefferson was also hoping to bring reform to the Executive branch, replacing Federalists and active opponents throughout the officer corps to promote Republican values.

Jefferson took great interest in the Library of Congress, which had been established in 1800.  He often recommended books to acquire.  In 1802, Congress authorized President Jefferson to name the first Librarian of Congress, and formed a committee to establish library rules and regulations. Congress also granted the president and vice president the right to use the library.

Foreign affairs (1801–1805)

First Barbary War

American merchant ships had been protected from Barbary Coast pirates by the Royal Navy when the states were British colonies. After independence, however, pirates often captured U.S. merchant ships, pillaged cargoes, and enslaved or held crew members for ransom. Jefferson had opposed paying tribute to the Barbary States since 1785. In 1801, he authorized a U.S. Navy fleet under Commodore Richard Dale to make a show of force in the Mediterranean, the first American naval squadron to cross the Atlantic. Following the fleet's first engagement, he successfully asked Congress for a declaration of war. The subsequent "First Barbary War" was the first foreign war fought by the U.S.

The American navy forced Tunis and Algiers into breaking their alliance with Tripoli. Jefferson ordered five separate naval bombardments of Tripoli, leading the pasha to sign a treaty that restored peace in the Mediterranean. This victory proved only temporary, but according to Wood, "many Americans celebrated it as a vindication of their policy of spreading free trade around the world and as a great victory for liberty over tyranny."

Louisiana Purchase

Spain ceded ownership of the Louisiana territory in 1800 to the more predominant France. Jefferson was greatly concerned that Napoleon's broad interests in the vast territory would threaten the security of the continent and Mississippi River shipping. He wrote that the cession "works most sorely on the U.S. It completely reverses all the political relations of the U.S." In 1802, he instructed James Monroe and Robert R. Livingston to negotiate with Napoleon to purchase New Orleans and adjacent coastal areas from France.

Napoleon realized that French military control was impractical over such a vast remote territory, and he was in dire need of funds for his wars on the home front. In early April 1803, he unexpectedly made negotiators a counter-offer to sell  of French territory for $15 million, doubling the size of the United States. U.S. negotiators seized this unique opportunity and accepted the offer and signed the treaty on April 30, 1803. Word of the unexpected purchase did not reach Jefferson until July 3, 1803. He unknowingly acquired the most fertile tract of land of its size on Earth, making the new country self-sufficient in food and other resources. The sale also significantly curtailed the European presence in North America, removing obstacles to U.S. westward expansion.

Most thought that this was an exceptional opportunity, despite Republican reservations about the Constitutional authority of the federal government to acquire land. Jefferson initially thought that a Constitutional amendment was necessary to purchase and govern the new territory; but he later changed his mind, fearing that this would give cause to oppose the purchase, and he therefore urged a speedy debate and ratification. On October 20, 1803, the Senate ratified the purchase treaty by a vote of 24–7. Jefferson personally was humble about acquiring the Louisiana Territory, but he resented complainers who called the vast domain a "howling wilderness".

After the purchase, Jefferson preserved the region's Spanish legal code and instituted a gradual approach to integrating settlers into American democracy. He believed that a period of the federal rule would be necessary while Louisianans adjusted to their new nation. Historians have differed in their assessments regarding the constitutional implications of the sale, but they typically hail the Louisiana acquisition as a major accomplishment. Frederick Jackson Turner called the purchase the most formative event in American history.

Lewis and Clark Expedition (1803–1806)

Jefferson anticipated further westward settlements due to the Louisiana Purchase and arranged for the exploration and mapping of the uncharted territory. He sought to establish a U.S. claim ahead of competing European interests and to find the rumored Northwest Passage. Jefferson and others were influenced by exploration accounts of Le Page du Pratz in Louisiana (1763) and Captain James Cook in the Pacific (1784), and they persuaded Congress in 1804 to fund an expedition to explore and map the newly acquired territory to the Pacific Ocean.

Jefferson appointed Meriwether Lewis and William Clark to be leaders of the Corps of Discovery (1803–1806). In the months leading up to the expedition, Jefferson tutored Lewis in the sciences of mapping, botany, natural history, mineralogy, and astronomy and navigation, giving him unlimited access to his library at Monticello, which included the largest collection of books in the world on the subject of the geography and natural history of the North American continent, along with an impressive collection of maps.

The expedition lasted from May 1804 to September 1806 (see timeline) and obtained a wealth of scientific and geographic knowledge, including knowledge of many Indian tribes.
Other expeditions

In addition to the Corps of Discovery, Jefferson organized three other western expeditions: the William Dunbar and George Hunter Expedition on the Ouachita River (1804–1805), the Thomas Freeman and Peter Custis Expedition (1806) on the Red River, and the Zebulon Pike Expedition (1806–1807) into the Rocky Mountains and the Southwest. All three produced valuable information about the American frontier.

Native American affairs

Jefferson's experiences with the American Indians began during his boyhood in Virginia and extended through his political career and into his retirement. He refuted the contemporary notion that Indians were inferior people and maintained that they were equal in body and mind to people of European descent.

As governor of Virginia during the Revolutionary War, Jefferson recommended moving the Cherokee and Shawnee tribes, who had allied with the British, to west of the Mississippi River. But when he took office as president, he quickly took measures to avert another major conflict, as American and Indian societies were in collision and the British were inciting Indian tribes from Canada. In Georgia, he stipulated that the state would release its legal claims for lands to its west in exchange for military support in expelling the Cherokee from Georgia. This facilitated his policy of western expansion, to "advance compactly as we multiply".

In keeping with his Enlightenment thinking, President Jefferson adopted an assimilation policy toward American Indians known as his "civilization program" which included securing peaceful U.S. – Indian treaty alliances and encouraging agriculture. Jefferson advocated that Indian tribes should make federal purchases by credit holding their lands as collateral for repayment. Various tribes accepted Jefferson's policies, including the Shawnees led by Black Hoof, the Creek, and the Cherokees. However, some Shawnees broke off from Black Hoof, led by Tecumseh, and opposed Jefferson's assimilation policies.

Historian Bernard Sheehan argues that Jefferson believed that assimilation was best for American Indians; second best was removal to the west. He felt that the worst outcome of the cultural and resources conflict between American citizens and American Indians would be their attacking the whites. Jefferson told Secretary of War General Henry Dearborn (Indian affairs were then under the War Department), "If we are constrained to lift the hatchet against any tribe, we will never lay it down until that tribe is exterminated or driven beyond the Mississippi." Miller agrees that Jefferson believed that Indians should assimilate to American customs and agriculture. Historians such as Peter S. Onuf and Merrill D. Peterson argue that Jefferson's actual Indian policies did little to promote assimilation and were a pretext to seize lands.

Re-election in 1804 and second term

Jefferson's successful first term occasioned his re-nomination for president by the Republican party, with George Clinton replacing Burr as his running mate. The Federalist party ran Charles Cotesworth Pinckney of South Carolina, John Adams's vice-presidential candidate in the 1800 election. The Jefferson-Clinton ticket won overwhelmingly in the electoral college vote, by 162 to 14, promoting their achievement of a strong economy, lower taxes, and the Louisiana Purchase.

In March 1806, a split developed in the Republican party, led by fellow Virginian and former Republican ally John Randolph who viciously accused President Jefferson on the floor of the House of moving too far in the Federalist direction. In so doing, Randolph permanently set himself apart politically from Jefferson. Jefferson and Madison had backed resolutions to limit or ban British imports in retaliation for British seizures of American shipping. Also, in 1808, Jefferson was the first president to propose a broad Federal plan to build roads and canals across several states, asking for $20 million, further alarming Randolph and believers of limited government.

Jefferson's popularity further suffered in his second term due to his response to wars in Europe. Positive relations with Great Britain had diminished, due partly to the antipathy between Jefferson and British diplomat Anthony Merry. After Napoleon's decisive victory at the Battle of Austerlitz in 1805, Napoleon became more aggressive in his negotiations over trading rights, which American efforts failed to counter. Jefferson then led the enactment of the Embargo Act of 1807, directed at both France and Great Britain. This triggered economic chaos in the U.S. and was strongly criticized at the time, resulting in Jefferson having to abandon the policy a year later.

During the revolutionary era, the states abolished the international slave trade, but South Carolina reopened it. In his annual message of December 1806, Jefferson denounced the "violations of human rights" attending the international slave trade, calling on the newly elected Congress to criminalize it immediately. In 1807, Congress passed the Act Prohibiting Importation of Slaves, which Jefferson signed. The act established severe punishment against the international slave trade, although it did not address the issue domestically.

In Haiti, Jefferson's neutrality had allowed arms to enable the slave independence movement during its Revolution, and blocked attempts to assist Napoleon, who was defeated there in 1803. But he refused official recognition of the country during his second term, in deference to southern complaints about the racial violence against slave-holders; it was eventually extended to Haiti in 1862.

Domestically, Jefferson's grandson James Madison Randolph became the first child born in the White House in 1806.

Controversies

Burr conspiracy and trial

Following the 1801 electoral deadlock, Jefferson's relationship with his vice president, former New York Senator Aaron Burr, rapidly eroded. Jefferson suspected Burr of seeking the presidency for himself, while Burr was angered by Jefferson's refusal to appoint some of his supporters to federal office. Burr was dropped from the Republican ticket in 1804.

The same year, Burr was soundly defeated in his bid to be elected New York governor. During the campaign, Alexander Hamilton publicly made callous remarks regarding Burr's moral character. Subsequently, Burr challenged Hamilton to a duel, mortally wounding him on July 11, 1804. Burr was indicted for Hamilton's murder in New York and New Jersey, causing him to flee to Georgia, although he remained President of the Senate during Supreme Court Justice Samuel Chase's impeachment trial. Both indictments quietly died and Burr was not prosecuted. Also during the election, certain New England separatists approached Burr, desiring a New England federation and intimating that he would be their leader. However, nothing came of the plot, since Burr had lost the election and his reputation was ruined after killing Hamilton. In August 1804, Burr contacted British Minister Anthony Merry offering to cede U.S. western territory in return for money and British ships.

After leaving office in April 1805, Burr traveled west and conspired with Louisiana Territory governor James Wilkinson, beginning a large-scale recruitment for a military expedition. Other plotters included Ohio Senator John Smith and an Irishman named Harmon Blennerhassett. Burr discussed a number of plots—seizing control of Mexico or Spanish Florida, or forming a secessionist state in New Orleans or the Western U.S. Historians remain unclear as to his true goal.

In the fall of 1806, Burr launched a military flotilla carrying about 60 men down the Ohio River. Wilkinson renounced the plot, apparently from self-interested motives; he reported Burr's expedition to Jefferson, who immediately ordered Burr's arrest. On February 13, 1807, Burr was captured in Louisiana's Bayou Pierre wilderness and sent to Virginia to be tried for treason.

Burr's 1807 conspiracy trial became a national issue. Jefferson attempted to preemptively influence the verdict by telling Congress that Burr's guilt was "beyond question", but the case came before his longtime political foe John Marshall, who dismissed the treason charge. Burr's legal team at one stage subpoenaed Jefferson, but Jefferson refused to testify, making the first argument for executive privilege. Instead, Jefferson provided relevant legal documents. After a three-month trial, the jury found Burr not guilty, while Jefferson denounced his acquittal. Jefferson subsequently removed Wilkinson as territorial governor but retained him in the U.S. military. Historian James N. Banner criticized Jefferson for continuing to trust Wilkinson, a "faithless plotter".

General Wilkinson misconduct
Commanding General James Wilkinson was a holdover of the Washington and Adams administrations. Wilkinson was rumored to be a "skillful and unscrupolous plotter". In 1804, Wilkinson received 12,000 pesos from the Spanish for information on American boundary plans. Wilkinson also received advances on his salary and payments on claims submitted to Secretary of War Henry Dearborn. This damaging information apparently was unknown to Jefferson. In 1805, Jefferson trusted Wilkinson and appointed him Louisiana Territory governor, admiring Wilkinson's work ethic. In January 1806, Jefferson received information from Kentucky U.S. Attorney Joseph Davies that Wilkinson was on the Spanish payroll. Jefferson took no action against Wilkinson, there being, at the time, a lack of evidence against Wilkinson. An investigation by the House in December 1807 exonerated Wilkinson. In 1808, a military court looked into Wilkinson but lacked evidence to charge him. Jefferson retained Wilkinson in the Army and he was passed on by Jefferson to Jefferson's successor James Madison. Evidence found in Spanish archives in the 20th century proved Wilkinson was, in fact, on the Spanish payroll.

Foreign affairs (1805–1809)

Attempted annexation of Florida
In the aftermath of the Louisiana Purchase, Jefferson attempted to annex West Florida from Spain, a nation under the control of Emperor Napoleon and the French Empire after 1804. In his annual message to Congress, on December 3, 1805, Jefferson railed against Spain over Florida border depredations. A few days later Jefferson secretly requested a two million dollar expenditure to purchase Florida. Representative and floor leader John Randolph, however, opposed annexation and was upset over Jefferson's secrecy on the matter, and believed the money would land in the coffers of Napoleon. The Two Million Dollar bill passed only after Jefferson successfully maneuvered to replace Randolph with Barnabas Bidwell as floor leader. This aroused suspicion of Jefferson and charges of undue executive influence over Congress. Jefferson signed the bill into law in February 1806. Six weeks later the law was made public. The two million dollars was to be given to France as payment, in turn, to put pressure on Spain to permit the annexation of Florida by the United States. France, however, was in no mood to allow Spain to give up Florida and refused the offer. Florida remained under the control of Spain. The failed venture damaged Jefferson's reputation among his supporters.

Chesapeake–Leopard affair

The British conducted seizures of American shipping to search for British deserters from 1806 to 1807; American citizens were thus impressed into the British naval service. In 1806, Jefferson issued a call for a boycott of British goods; on April 18, Congress passed the Non-Importation Acts, but they were never enforced. Later that year, Jefferson asked James Monroe and William Pinkney to negotiate with Great Britain to end the harassment of American shipping, though Britain showed no signs of improving relations. The Monroe–Pinkney Treaty was finalized but lacked any provisions to end the British policies, and Jefferson refused to submit it to the Senate for ratification.

He issued a proclamation banning armed British ships from U.S. waters. He presumed unilateral authority to call on the states to prepare 100,000 militia and ordered the purchase of arms, ammunition, and supplies, writing, "The laws of necessity, of self-preservation, of saving our country when in danger, are of higher obligation [than strict observance of written laws]". The  was dispatched to demand an explanation from the British government; it also was fired upon. Jefferson called for a special session of Congress in October to enact an embargo or alternatively to consider war.

Embargo (1807–1809)

In December 1807, news arrived that Napoleon had extended the Berlin Decree, globally banning British imports. In Britain, King George III ordered redoubling efforts at impressment, including American sailors. But the war fever of the summer faded; Congress had no appetite to prepare the U.S. for war. Jefferson asked for and received the Embargo Act, an alternative that allowed the U.S. more time to build up defensive works, militias, and naval forces. Later historians have seen the irony in Jefferson's assertion of such federal power. Meacham said that the Embargo Act was a projection of power that surpassed the Alien and Sedition Acts, and R. B. Bernstein said that Jefferson "was pursuing policies resembling those he had cited in 1776 as grounds for independence and revolution".

In November 1807, Jefferson, for several days, met with his cabinet to discuss the deteriorating foreign situation. Secretary of State James Madison supported the embargo with equal vigor to Jefferson, while Treasury Secretary Gallatin opposed it, due to its indefinite time frame and the risk that it posed to the policy of American neutrality. The U.S. economy suffered, criticism grew, and opponents began evading the embargo. Instead of retreating, Jefferson sent federal agents to secretly track down smugglers and violators. Three acts were passed in Congress during 1807 and 1808, called the Supplementary, the Additional, and the Enforcement acts. The government could not prevent American vessels from trading with the European belligerents once they had left American ports, although the embargo triggered a devastating decline in exports.

Most historians consider Jefferson's embargo to have been ineffective and harmful to American interests. Appleby describes the strategy as Jefferson's "least effective policy", and Joseph Ellis calls it "an unadulterated calamity". Others, however, portray it as an innovative, nonviolent measure which aided France in its war with Britain while preserving American neutrality. Jefferson believed that the failure of the embargo was due to selfish traders and merchants showing a lack of "republican virtue." He maintained that, had the embargo been widely observed, it would have avoided war in 1812.

In December 1807, Jefferson announced his intention not to seek a third term. He turned his attention increasingly to Monticello during the last year of his presidency, giving Madison and Gallatin almost total control of affairs. Shortly before leaving office in March 1809, Jefferson signed the repeal of the Embargo. In its place, the Non-Intercourse Act was passed, but it proved no more effective. The day before Madison was inaugurated as his successor, Jefferson said that he felt like "a prisoner, released from his chains".

Cabinet

Post-presidency (1809–1826)

Following his retirement from the presidency, Jefferson continued his pursuit of educational interests; he sold his vast collection of books to the Library of Congress, and founded and built the University of Virginia. Jefferson continued to correspond with many of the country's leaders (including his two protégées who succeeded him as president), and the Monroe Doctrine bears a strong resemblance to solicited advice that Jefferson gave to Monroe in 1823. As he settled into private life at Monticello, Jefferson developed a daily routine of rising early. He would spend several hours writing letters, with which he was often deluged. In the midday, he would often inspect the plantation on horseback. In the evenings, his family enjoyed leisure time in the gardens; late at night, Jefferson would retire to bed with a book. However, his routine was often interrupted by uninvited visitors and tourists eager to see the icon in his final days, turning Monticello into "a virtual hotel".

University of Virginia

Jefferson envisioned a university free of church influences where students could specialize in many new areas not offered at other colleges. He believed that education engendered a stable society, which should provide publicly funded schools accessible to students from all social strata, based solely on ability. He initially proposed his University in a letter to Joseph Priestley in 1800 and, in 1819, the 76-year-old Jefferson founded the University of Virginia. He organized the state legislative campaign for its charter and, with the assistance of Edmund Bacon, purchased the location. He was the principal designer of the buildings, planned the university's curriculum, and served as the first rector upon its opening in 1825.

Jefferson was a strong disciple of Greek and Roman architectural styles, which he believed to be most representative of American democracy. Each academic unit, called a pavilion, was designed with a two-story temple front, while the library "Rotunda" was modeled on the Roman Pantheon. Jefferson referred to the university's grounds as the "Academical Village," and he reflected his educational ideas in its layout. The ten pavilions included classrooms and faculty residences; they formed a quadrangle and were connected by colonnades, behind which stood the students' rows of rooms. Gardens and vegetable plots were placed behind the pavilions and were surrounded by serpentine walls, affirming the importance of the agrarian lifestyle. The university had a library rather than a church at its center, emphasizing its secular nature—a controversial aspect at the time.

When Jefferson died in 1826, James Madison replaced him as rector. Jefferson bequeathed most of his library to the university. Only one other ex-president has founded a university, namely Millard Fillmore who founded the University at Buffalo.

Reconciliation with Adams

Jefferson and John Adams had been good friends in the first decades of their political careers, serving together in the Continental Congress in the 1770s and in Europe in the 1780s. The Federalist/Republican split of the 1790s divided them, however, and Adams felt betrayed by Jefferson's sponsorship of partisan attacks, such as those of James Callender. Jefferson, on the other hand, was angered at Adams for his appointment of "midnight judges". The two men did not communicate directly for more than a decade after Jefferson succeeded Adams as president. A brief correspondence took place between Abigail Adams and Jefferson after Jefferson's daughter Polly died in 1804, in an attempt at reconciliation unknown to Adams. However, an exchange of letters resumed open hostilities between Adams and Jefferson.

As early as 1809, Benjamin Rush, signer of the Declaration of Independence, desired that Jefferson and Adams reconcile and began to prod the two through correspondence to re-establish contact. In 1812, Adams wrote a short New Year's greeting to Jefferson, prompted earlier by Rush, to which Jefferson warmly responded. Thus began what historian David McCullough calls "one of the most extraordinary correspondences in American history". Over the next fourteen years, the former presidents exchanged 158 letters discussing their political differences, justifying their respective roles in events, and debating the revolution's import to the world. When Adams died, his last words included an acknowledgment of his longtime friend and rival: "Thomas Jefferson survives", unaware that Jefferson had died several hours before.

Autobiography
In 1821, at the age of 77, Jefferson began writing his autobiography, in order to "state some recollections of dates and facts concerning myself". He focused on the struggles and achievements he experienced until July 29, 1790, where the narrative stopped short. He excluded his youth, emphasizing the revolutionary era. He related that his ancestors came from Wales to America in the early 17th century and settled in the western frontier of the Virginia colony, which influenced his zeal for individual and state rights. Jefferson described his father as uneducated, but with a "strong mind and sound judgement". His enrollment in the College of William and Mary and election to the Continental Congress in Philadelphia in 1775 were included.

He also expressed opposition to the idea of a privileged aristocracy made up of large landowning families partial to the King, and instead promoted "the aristocracy of virtue and talent, which nature has wisely provided for the direction of the interests of society, & scattered with equal hand through all its conditions, was deemed essential to a well-ordered republic".

Jefferson gave his insight into people, politics, and events. The work is primarily concerned with the Declaration and reforming the government of Virginia. He used notes, letters, and documents to tell many of the stories within the autobiography. He suggested that this history was so rich that his personal affairs were better overlooked, but he incorporated a self-analysis using the Declaration and other patriotism.

Greek War of Independence 
Thomas Jefferson was a philhellene who sympathized with the Greek War of Independence. He has been described as the most influential of the Founding Fathers who supported the Greek cause, viewing it as similar to the American Revolution. By 1823, Jefferson was exchanging ideas with Greek scholar Adamantios Korais. Jefferson advised Korais on building the political system of Greece by using classical liberalism and examples from the American governmental system, ultimately prescribing a government akin to that of a U.S. state. He also suggested the application of a classical education system for the newly founded First Hellenic Republic, where public education would be made available and pupils would be taught history, Latin, and Greek. Jefferson's philosophical instructions were welcomed by the Greek people. Korais became one of the designers of the Greek constitution and urged his associates to study Jefferson's works and other literature from the American Revolution.

Lafayette's visit

In the summer of 1824, the Marquis de Lafayette accepted an invitation from President James Monroe to visit the country. Jefferson and Lafayette had not seen each other since 1789. After visits to New York, New England, and Washington, Lafayette arrived at Monticello on November 4.

Jefferson's grandson Randolph was present and recorded the reunion: "As they approached each other, their uncertain gait quickened itself into a shuffling run, and exclaiming, 'Ah Jefferson!' 'Ah Lafayette!', they burst into tears as they fell into each other's arms." Jefferson and Lafayette then retired to the house to reminisce. The next morning Jefferson, Lafayette, and James Madison attended a tour and banquet at the University of Virginia. Jefferson had someone else read a speech he had prepared for Lafayette, as his voice was weak and could not carry. This was his last public presentation. After an 11-day visit, Lafayette bid Jefferson goodbye and departed Monticello.

Final days, death, and burial

Jefferson's approximately $100,000 of debt weighed heavily on his mind in his final months, as it became increasingly clear that he would have little to leave to his heirs. In February 1826, he successfully applied to the General Assembly to hold a public lottery as a fundraiser. His health began to deteriorate in July 1825, due to a combination of rheumatism from arm and wrist injuries, as well as intestinal and urinary disorders and, by June 1826, he was confined to bed. On July 3, Jefferson was overcome by fever and declined an invitation to Washington to attend an anniversary celebration of the Declaration.

During the last hours of his life, he was accompanied by family members and friends. Jefferson died on July 4 at 12:50 p.m. at age 83, the same day as the 50th anniversary of the Declaration of Independence. His last recorded words were "No, doctor, nothing more," refusing laudanum from his physician, but his final significant words are often cited as "Is it the Fourth?" or "This is the Fourth." When John Adams died later that same day, his last words included an acknowledgment of his longtime friend and rival: "Thomas Jefferson survives," though Adams was unaware that Jefferson had died several hours before. The sitting president was Adams's son, John Quincy Adams, and he called the coincidence of their deaths on the nation's anniversary "visible and palpable remarks of Divine Favor."

Shortly after Jefferson had died, attendants found a gold locket on a chain around his neck, where it had rested for more than 40 years, containing a small faded blue ribbon that tied a lock of his wife Martha's brown hair.

Jefferson's remains were buried at Monticello, under an epitaph that he wrote:

HERE WAS BURIED THOMAS JEFFERSON, AUTHOR OF THE DECLARATION OF AMERICAN INDEPENDENCE, OF THE STATUTE OF VIRGINIA FOR RELIGIOUS FREEDOM, AND FATHER OF THE UNIVERSITY OF VIRGINIA.

In his advanced years, Jefferson became increasingly concerned that people understand the principles in, and the people responsible for writing, the Declaration of Independence, and he continually defended himself as its author. He considered the document one of his greatest life achievements, in addition to authoring the Statute of Virginia for Religious Freedom and his founding of the University of Virginia. Plainly absent from his epitaph were his political roles, including President of the United States.

Jefferson died deeply in debt, unable to pass on his estate freely to his heirs. He gave instructions in his will for disposal of his assets, including the freeing of Sally Hemings's children; but his estate, possessions, and slaves were sold at public auctions starting in 1827. In 1831, Monticello was sold by Martha Jefferson Randolph and the other heirs.

Political, social, and religious views

Jefferson subscribed to the political ideals expounded by John Locke, Francis Bacon, and Isaac Newton, whom he considered the three greatest men who ever lived. He was also influenced by the writings of Gibbon, Hume, Robertson, Bolingbroke, Montesquieu, and Voltaire. Jefferson thought that the independent yeoman and agrarian life were ideals of republican virtues. He distrusted cities and financiers, favored decentralized government power, and believed that the tyranny that had plagued the common man in Europe was due to corrupt political establishments and monarchies. He supported efforts to disestablish the Church of England, wrote the Virginia Statute for Religious Freedom, and he pressed for a wall of separation between church and state. The Republicans under Jefferson were strongly influenced by the 18th-century British Whig Party, which believed in limited government. His Democratic-Republican Party became dominant in early American politics, and his views became known as Jeffersonian democracy.

Philosophy, society, and government

Jefferson wrote letters and speeches prolifically, and these show him to be conversant and well-read in the philosophical literature of his day and of antiquity. Nevertheless, some scholars do not take Jefferson seriously as a philosopher mainly because he did not produce a formal work on philosophy. However, he has been described as one of the most outstanding philosophical figures of his time because his work provided the theoretical background to, and the substance of, the social and political events of the revolutionary years and the period of the development of the American Constitution in the 1770s and 1780s. Jefferson continued to attend to more theoretical questions of natural philosophy and subsequently left behind a rich philosophical legacy in the form of presidential messages, letters to philosophically minded people, and public papers.

Jefferson described himself as an Epicurean and, although he adopted the Stoic belief in intuition and found comfort in the Stoic emphasis on the patient endurance of misfortune, he rejected most aspects of Stoicism with the notable exception of Epictetus' works. He rejected the Stoics' doctrine of a separable soul and their fatalism, and was angered by their misrepresentation of Epicureanism as mere hedonism. Jefferson knew Epicurean philosophy from original sources, but also mentioned Pierre Gassendi's Syntagma philosophicum as an influential source for his ideas on Epicureanism.

According to Jefferson's philosophy, citizens have "certain inalienable rights" and "rightful liberty is unobstructed action according to our will, within limits drawn around us by the equal rights of others." A staunch advocate of the jury system to protect people's liberties, he proclaimed in 1801, "I consider [trial by jury] as the only anchor yet imagined by man, by which a government can be held to the principles of its constitution."
Jeffersonian government not only prohibited individuals in society from infringing on the liberty of others, but also restrained itself from diminishing individual liberty as a protection against tyranny from the majority. Initially, Jefferson favored restricted voting to those who could actually have the free exercise of their reason by escaping any corrupting dependence on others. He advocated enfranchising a majority of Virginians, seeking to expand suffrage to include "yeoman farmers" who owned their own land while excluding tenant farmers, city day laborers, vagrants, most American Indians, and women.

He was convinced that individual liberties were the fruit of political equality, which was threatened by the arbitrary government. Excesses of democracy in his view were caused by institutional corruption rather than human nature. He was less suspicious of a working democracy than many contemporaries. As president, Jefferson feared that the federal system enacted by Washington and Adams had encouraged corrupting patronage and dependence. He tried to restore a balance between the state and federal governments more nearly reflecting the Articles of Confederation, seeking to reinforce state prerogatives where his party was in a majority.

Jefferson was steeped in the British Whig tradition of the oppressed majority set against a repeatedly unresponsive court party in the Parliament. He justified small outbreaks of rebellion as necessary to get monarchial regimes to amend oppressive measures compromising popular liberties. In a republican regime ruled by the majority, he acknowledged "it will often be exercised when wrong." But "the remedy is to set them right as to facts, pardon and pacify them." As Jefferson saw his party triumph in two terms of his presidency and launch into a third term under James Madison, his view of the U.S. as a continental republic and an "empire of liberty" grew more upbeat. On departing the presidency in 1809, he described America as "trusted with the destines of this solitary republic of the world, the only monument of human rights, and the sole depository of the sacred fire of freedom and self-government."

Democracy

Jefferson considered democracy to be the expression of society and promoted national self-determination, cultural uniformity, and education of all males of the commonwealth. He supported public education and a free press as essential components of a democratic nation.

After resigning as secretary of state in 1795, Jefferson focused on the electoral bases of the Republicans and Federalists. The "Republican" classification for which he advocated included "the entire body of landholders" everywhere and "the body of laborers" without land. Republicans united behind Jefferson as vice president, with the election of 1796 expanding democracy nationwide at grassroots levels. Jefferson promoted Republican candidates for local offices.

Beginning with Jefferson's electioneering for the "revolution of 1800," his political efforts were based on egalitarian appeals. In his later years, he referred to the 1800 election "as real a revolution in the principles of our government as that of '76 was in its form," one "not effected indeed by the sword ... but by the ... suffrage of the people." Voter participation grew during Jefferson's presidency, increasing to "unimaginable levels" compared to the Federalist Era, with turnout of about 67,000 in 1800 rising to about 143,000 in 1804.

At the onset of the Revolution, Jefferson accepted William Blackstone's argument that property ownership would sufficiently empower voters' independent judgement, but he sought to further expand suffrage by land distribution to the poor. In the heat of the Revolutionary Era and afterward, several states expanded voter eligibility from landed gentry to all propertied male, tax-paying citizens with Jefferson's support. In retirement, he gradually became critical of his home state for violating "the principle of equal political rights"—the social right of universal male suffrage. He sought a "general suffrage" of all taxpayers and militia-men, and equal representation by population in the General Assembly to correct preferential treatment of the slave-holding regions.

Religion

Baptized in his youth, Jefferson became a governing member of his local Episcopal Church in Charlottesville, which he later attended with his daughters. Jefferson, however, spurned Biblical views of Christianity. Influenced by Deist authors during his college years, Jefferson abandoned orthodox Christianity after his review of New Testament teachings.  Jefferson has sometimes been portrayed as a follower of the liberal religious strand of Deism that values reason over revelation. Nonetheless, in 1803, Jefferson asserted, "I am Christian, in the only sense in which [Jesus] wished any one to be."

Jefferson later defined being a Christian as one who followed the simple teachings of Jesus. Influenced by Joseph Priestley, Jefferson selected New Testament passages of Jesus' teachings into a private work he called The Life and Morals of Jesus of Nazareth, known today as the Jefferson Bible, never published during his lifetime. Jefferson believed that Jesus' message had been obscured and corrupted by Paul the Apostle, the Gospel writers and Protestant reformers. Peterson states that Jefferson was a theist "whose God was the Creator of the universe ... all the evidences of nature testified to His perfection; and man could rely on the harmony and beneficence of His work." In a letter to John Adams, Jefferson wrote that what he believed was genuinely Christ's, found in the Gospels, was "as easily distinguishable as diamonds in a dunghill". By omitting miracles and the resurrection, Jefferson made the figure of Jesus more compatible with a worldview based on reason.

Jefferson was firmly anticlerical, writing in "every age, the priest has been hostile to liberty ... they have perverted the purest religion ever preached to man into mystery and jargon." The full letter to Horatio Spatford can be read at the National Archives. Jefferson once supported banning clergy from public office but later relented. In 1777, he drafted the Virginia Statute for Religious Freedom. Ratified in 1786, it made compelling attendance or contributions to any state-sanctioned religious establishment illegal and declared that men "shall be free to profess ... their opinions in matters of religion." The Statute is one of only three accomplishments he chose to have inscribed in the epitaph on his gravestone. Early in 1802, Jefferson wrote to the Danbury Connecticut Baptist Association, "that religion is a matter which lies solely between Man and his God." He interpreted the First Amendment as having built "a wall of separation between Church and State." The phrase 'Separation of Church and State' has been cited several times by the Supreme Court in its interpretation of the Establishment Clause.

Jefferson donated to the American Bible Society, saying the Four Evangelists delivered a "pure and sublime system of morality" to humanity. He thought Americans would rationally create "Apiarian" religion, extracting the best traditions of every denomination. And he contributed generously to several local denominations near Monticello. Acknowledging organized religion would always be factored into political life for good or ill, he encouraged reason over supernatural revelation to make inquiries into religion. He believed in a creator god, an afterlife, and the sum of religion as loving God and neighbors. But he also controversially rejected fundamental Christian beliefs, denying the conventional Christian Trinity, Jesus's divinity as the Son of God and miracles, the Resurrection of Christ, atonement from sin, and original sin. Jefferson believed that the original sin was a gross injustice and that God did not condemn all of humanity by the transgression of Adam and Eve in the Garden of Eden.

Jefferson's unorthodox religious beliefs became an important issue in the 1800 presidential election. Federalists attacked him as an atheist. As president, Jefferson countered the accusations by praising religion in his inaugural address and attending services at the Capitol.

Banks

Jefferson distrusted government banks and opposed public borrowing, which he thought created long-term debt, bred monopolies, and invited dangerous speculation as opposed to productive labor. In one letter to Madison, he argued each generation should curtail all debt within 19 years, and not impose a long-term debt on subsequent generations.

In 1791, President Washington asked Jefferson, then secretary of state, and Hamilton, the secretary of the treasury, if the Congress had the authority to create a national bank. While Hamilton believed Congress had the authority, Jefferson and Madison thought a national bank would ignore the needs of individuals and farmers, and would violate the Tenth Amendment by assuming powers not granted to the federal government by the states. Hamilton successfully argued that the implied powers given to the federal government in the Constitution supported the creation of a national bank, among other federal actions.

Jefferson used agrarian resistance to banks and speculators as the first defining principle of an opposition party, recruiting candidates for Congress on the issue as early as 1792. As president, Jefferson was persuaded by Secretary of the Treasury Albert Gallatin to leave the bank intact but sought to restrain its influence.

Slavery

Jefferson lived in a planter economy largely dependent upon slavery, and as a wealthy landholder, used slave labor for his household, plantation, and workshops. He first recorded his slaveholding in 1774, when he counted 41 enslaved people. Over his lifetime he owned about 600 slaves; he inherited about 175 people while most of the remainder were people born on his plantations. Jefferson purchased some slaves in order to reunite their families. He sold approximately 110 people for economic reasons, primarily slaves from his outlying farms. In 1784 when the number of slaves he owned likely was approximately 200, he began to divest himself of many slaves, and by 1794 he had divested himself of 161 individuals.

Approximately 100 slaves lived at Monticello at any given time. In 1817, the plantation recorded its largest slave population of 140 individuals.

Jefferson once said, "My first wish is that the labourers may be well treated". Jefferson did not work his slaves on Sundays and Christmas and he allowed them more personal time during the winter months. Some scholars doubt Jefferson's benevolence, however, noting cases of excessive slave whippings in his absence. His nail factory was staffed only by enslaved children. Many of the enslaved boys became tradesmen. Burwell Colbert, who started his working life as a child in Monticello's Nailery, was later promoted to the supervisory position of butler.

Jefferson felt slavery was harmful to both slave and master but had reservations about releasing slaves from captivity, and advocated for gradual emancipation. In 1779, he proposed gradual voluntary training and resettlement to the Virginia legislature, and three years later drafted legislation allowing slaveholders to free their own slaves. In his draft of the Declaration of Independence, he included a section, stricken by other Southern delegates, criticizing King George III for supposedly forcing slavery onto the colonies. In 1784, Jefferson proposed the abolition of slavery in all western U.S. territories, limiting slave importation to 15 years. Congress, however, failed to pass his proposal by one vote. In 1787, Congress passed the Northwest Ordinance, a partial victory for Jefferson that terminated slavery in the Northwest Territory. Jefferson freed his slave Robert Hemings in 1794 and he freed his cook slave James Hemings in 1796. Jefferson freed his runaway slave Harriet Hemings in 1822. Upon his death in 1826, Jefferson freed five male Hemings slaves in his will.

During his presidency, Jefferson allowed the diffusion of slavery into the Louisiana Territory hoping to prevent slave uprisings in Virginia and to prevent South Carolina secession. In 1804, in a compromise on the slavery issue, Jefferson and Congress banned domestic slave trafficking for one year into the Louisiana Territory. In 1806 he officially called for anti-slavery legislation terminating the import or export of slaves. Congress passed the law in 1807.

In 1819, Jefferson strongly opposed a Missouri statehood application amendment that banned domestic slave importation and freed slaves at the age of 25 on grounds it would destroy the union.  In Notes on the State of Virginia, he created controversy by calling slavery a moral evil for which the nation would ultimately have to account to God. Jefferson wrote of his "suspicion" that Black people were mentally and physically inferior to Whites, but argued that they nonetheless had innate human rights. He therefore supported colonization plans that would transport freed slaves to another country, such as Liberia or Sierra Leone, though he recognized the impracticability of such proposals.

During his presidency, Jefferson was for the most part publicly silent on the issue of slavery and emancipation, as the Congressional debate over slavery and its extension caused a dangerous north–south rift among the states, with talk of a northern confederacy in New England. The violent attacks on white slave owners during the Haitian Revolution due to injustices under slavery supported Jefferson's fears of a race war, increasing his reservations about promoting emancipation at that time. After numerous attempts and failures to bring about emancipation, Jefferson wrote privately in an 1805 letter to William A. Burwell, "I have long since given up the expectation of any early provision for the extinguishment of slavery among us." That same year he also related this idea to George Logan, writing, "I have most carefully avoided every public act or manifestation on that subject."

Historical assessment
Scholars remain divided on whether Jefferson truly condemned slavery and how he changed. Francis D. Cogliano traces the development of competing emancipationist then revisionist and finally contextualist interpretations from the 1960s to the present. The emancipationist view, held by the various scholars at the Thomas Jefferson Foundation, Douglas L. Wilson, John Ferling, and others, maintains Jefferson was an opponent of slavery all his life, noting that he did what he could within the limited range of options available to him to undermine it, his many attempts at abolition legislation, the manner in which he provided for slaves, and his advocacy of their more humane treatment.

One month before the Act Prohibiting Importation of Slaves came into effect, in his annual message to Congress, Jefferson denounced the "violations of human rights." He said:

The revisionist view, advanced by Paul Finkelman and others, criticizes him for holding slaves, and for acting contrary to his words. Jefferson never freed most of his slaves, and he remained silent on the issue while he was president. Contextualists such as Joseph J. Ellis emphasize a change in Jefferson's thinking from his emancipationist views before 1783, noting Jefferson's shift toward public passivity and procrastination on policy issues related to slavery. Jefferson seemed to yield to public opinion by 1794 as he laid the groundwork for his first presidential campaign against Adams in 1796.

Historian Henry Wiencek said Jefferson "rationalized an abomination to the point where an absolute moral reversal was reached and he made slavery fit into America's national enterprise."

Jefferson–Hemings controversy

Claims that Jefferson fathered Sally Hemings's children have been debated since 1802. That year James T. Callender, after being denied a position as postmaster, alleged Jefferson had taken Hemings as a concubine and fathered several children with her. In 1998, a panel of researchers conducted a Y-DNA study of living descendants of Jefferson's uncle, Field, and of a descendant of Hemings's son, Eston Hemings. The results, released in November 1998, showed a match with the male Jefferson line. Subsequently, the Thomas Jefferson Foundation (TJF) formed a nine-member research team of historians to assess the matter. In January 2000 (revised 2011), the TJF report concluded that "the DNA study ... indicates a high probability that Thomas Jefferson fathered Eston Hemings." The TJF also concluded that Jefferson likely fathered all of Hemings's children listed at Monticello.

In July 2017, the TJF announced that archeological excavations at Monticello had revealed what they believe to have been Sally Hemings's quarters, adjacent to Jefferson's bedroom. In 2018, the TJF said that it considered the issue "a settled historical matter." Since the results of the DNA tests were made public, the consensus among most historians has been that Jefferson had a sexual relationship with Sally Hemings and that he was the father of her son Eston Hemings.

Still, a minority of scholars maintain the evidence is insufficient to prove Jefferson's paternity conclusively. Based on DNA and other evidence, they note the possibility that additional Jefferson males, including his brother Randolph Jefferson and any one of Randolph's four sons, or his cousin, could have fathered Eston Hemings or Sally Hemings's other children. In 2002, historian Merrill Peterson said: "in the absence of direct documentary evidence either proving or refuting the allegation, nothing conclusive can be said about Jefferson's relations with Sally Hemings." Concerning the 1998 DNA study Peterson said: "the results of the DNA testing of Jefferson and Hemings descendants provided support for the idea that Jefferson was the father of at least one of Sally Hemings's children."

After Thomas Jefferson's death, although not formally manumitted, Sally Hemings was allowed by Jefferson's daughter Martha to live in Charlottesville as a free woman with her two sons until her death in 1835. The Monticello Association refused to allow Sally Hemings' descendants the right of burial at Monticello.

Interests and activities

Jefferson was a farmer, obsessed with new crops, soil conditions, garden designs, and scientific agricultural techniques. His main cash crop was tobacco, but its price was usually low and it was rarely profitable. He tried to achieve self-sufficiency with wheat, vegetables, flax, corn, hogs, sheep, poultry, and cattle to supply his family, slaves, and employees, but he lived perpetually beyond his means and was always in debt.

In the field of architecture, Jefferson helped popularize the Neo-Palladian style in the United States utilizing designs for the Virginia State Capitol, the University of Virginia, Monticello, and others. It has been speculated that he was inspired by the Château de Rastignac in south-west France—the plans of which he saw during his ambassadorship—to convince the architect of the White House to modify the South Portico to resemble the château. Jefferson mastered architecture through self-study, using various books and classical architectural designs of the day. His primary authority was Andrea Palladio's 1570 The Four Books of Architecture, which outlines the principles of classical design.

He was interested in birds and wine, and was a noted gourmet; he was also a prolific writer and linguist, and spoke several languages. As a naturalist, he was fascinated by the Natural Bridge geological formation, and in 1774 successfully acquired the Bridge by a grant from George III.

American Philosophical Society
Jefferson was a member of the American Philosophical Society for 35 years, beginning in 1780. Through the society he advanced the sciences and Enlightenment ideals, emphasizing that knowledge of science reinforced and extended freedom. His Notes on the State of Virginia was written in part as a contribution to the society. He became the society's third president on March 3, 1797, a few months after he was elected Vice President of the United States. In accepting, Jefferson stated: "I feel no qualification for this distinguished post but a sincere zeal for all the objects of our institution and an ardent desire to see knowledge so disseminated through the mass of mankind that it may at length reach even the extremes of society, beggars and kings."

Jefferson served as APS president for the next eighteen years, including through both terms of his presidency. He introduced Meriwether Lewis to the society, where various scientists tutored him in preparation for the Lewis and Clark Expedition. He resigned on January 20, 1815, but remained active through correspondence.

Linguistics
Jefferson had a lifelong interest in linguistics, and could speak, read, and write in a number of languages, including French, Greek, Italian, and German. In his early years, he excelled in classical language while at boarding school where he received a classical education in Greek and Latin. Jefferson later came to regard the Greek language as the "perfect language" as expressed in its laws and philosophy. While attending the College of William & Mary, he taught himself Italian. Here Jefferson first became familiar with the Anglo-Saxon language, especially as it was associated with English Common law and system of government and studied the language in a linguistic and philosophical capacity. He owned 17 volumes of Anglo-Saxon texts and grammar and later wrote an essay on the Anglo-Saxon language.

Jefferson claimed to have taught himself Spanish during his nineteen-day journey to France, using only a grammar guide and a copy of Don Quixote. Linguistics played a significant role in how Jefferson modeled and expressed political and philosophical ideas. He believed that the study of ancient languages was essential in understanding the roots of modern language. He collected and understood a number of American Indian vocabularies and instructed Lewis and Clark to record and collect various Indian languages during their Expedition. When Jefferson moved from Washington after his presidency, he packed 50 Native American vocabulary lists in a chest and transported them on a riverboat back to Monticello along with the rest of his possessions. Somewhere along the journey, a thief stole the heavy chest, thinking it was full of valuables, but its contents were dumped into the James River when the thief discovered it was only filled with papers. Subsequently, 30 years of collecting were lost, with only a few fragments rescued from the muddy banks of the river.

Jefferson was not an outstanding orator and preferred to communicate through writing or remain silent if possible. Instead of delivering his State of the Union addresses himself, Jefferson wrote the annual messages and sent a representative to read them aloud in Congress. This started a tradition that continued until 1913 when President Woodrow Wilson (1913–1921) chose to deliver his own State of the Union address.

Inventions
Jefferson invented many small practical devices and improved contemporary inventions, including a revolving book-stand and a "Great Clock" powered by the gravitational pull on cannonballs. He improved the pedometer, the polygraph (a device for duplicating writing), and the moldboard plow, an idea he never patented and gave to posterity. Jefferson can also be credited as the creator of the swivel chair, the first of which he created and used to write much of the Declaration of Independence. He first opposed patents and later supported them. In 1790–1793, as Secretary of State, he was the ex officio head of the three-person patent review board (the Secretary of War and the Attorney General being the other two patent reviewers). He drafted reforms of US patent law which lead to him being relieved of this duty in 1793, and also drastically changed the patent system.

As Minister to France, Jefferson was impressed by the military standardization program known as the Système Gribeauval, and initiated a program as president to develop interchangeable parts for firearms. For his inventiveness and ingenuity, he received several honorary Doctor of Law degrees.

Legacy

Historical reputation
Jefferson is an icon of individual liberty, democracy, and republicanism, hailed as the author of the Declaration of Independence, an architect of the American Revolution, and a renaissance man who promoted science and scholarship. The participatory democracy and expanded suffrage he championed defined his era and became a standard for later generations. Meacham opined that Jefferson was the most influential figure of the democratic republic in its first half-century, succeeded by presidential adherents James Madison, James Monroe, Andrew Jackson, and Martin Van Buren. Jefferson is recognized for having written more than 18,000 letters of political and philosophical substance during his life, which Francis D. Cogliano describes as "a documentary legacy ... unprecedented in American history in its size and breadth."

Jefferson's reputation declined during the American Civil War, due to his support of states' rights. In the late 19th century, his legacy was widely criticized; conservatives felt that his democratic philosophy had led to that era's populist movement, while Progressives sought a more activist federal government than Jefferson's philosophy allowed. Both groups saw Alexander Hamilton as vindicated by history, rather than Jefferson, and President Woodrow Wilson even described Jefferson as "though a great man, not a great American".

In the 1930s, Jefferson was held in higher esteem; President Franklin D. Roosevelt (1933–1945) and New Deal Democrats celebrated his struggles for "the common man" and reclaimed him as their party's founder. Jefferson became a symbol of American democracy in the incipient Cold War, and the 1940s and 1950s saw the zenith of his popular reputation. Following the civil rights movement of the 1950s and 1960s, Jefferson's slaveholding came under new scrutiny, particularly after DNA testing in the late 1990s supported allegations that he had fathered multiple children with Sally Hemings.

Noting the huge output of scholarly books on Jefferson in recent years, historian Gordon Wood summarizes the raging debates about Jefferson's stature: "Although many historians and others are embarrassed about his contradictions and have sought to knock him off the democratic pedestal ... his position, though shaky, still seems secure."

The Siena Research Institute poll of presidential scholars, begun in 1982, has consistently ranked Jefferson as one of the five best U.S. presidents, and a 2015 Brookings Institution poll of American Political Science Association members ranked him as the fifth greatest president.

Jefferson is portrayed in the popular Broadway musical Hamilton played by Daveed Diggs (Who also played the Marquis de Lafayette) for the Broadway opening in 2015. During the Broadway musical, the character of Jefferson is portrayed as being joined by Madison and Burr in confronting Hamilton about his affaire de cœur in the Reynolds affair and they together intone the rap lyrics to the song "We Know" aimed at Hamilton.

In 2020, historian Annette Gordon-Reed said that Jefferson's "vision of equality" did not include all people, as it primarily excluded both blacks and women. Jefferson believed that Native peoples could be citizens, as long as they agreed to assimilate into white society. According to her, Jefferson put little effort into obtaining freedom for black slaves, as he did for white colonists from Britain. She also said that Jefferson was doubtful of the intellectual capacity of blacks, compared to whites and also was hesitant to advocate or examine the equality of women.  The assertion in the Declaration of Independence that it was "self-evident" that "all men are created equal" inspired women, men, blacks, and whites to pursue equality. Others contend that Jefferson included women as well as men when he wrote that "all men are created equal" and that he believed in women's natural equality as expressed in Notes on the State of Virginia.

Memorials and honors

Jefferson has been memorialized with buildings, sculptures, postage, and currency. In the 1920s, Jefferson, together with George Washington, Theodore Roosevelt, and Abraham Lincoln, was chosen by sculptor Gutzon Borglum and approved by President Calvin Coolidge to be depicted in stone at the Mount Rushmore Memorial.

The Jefferson Memorial was dedicated in Washington, D.C. in 1943, on the 200th anniversary of Jefferson's birth. The interior of the memorial includes a  statue of Jefferson by Rudulph Evans and engravings of passages from Jefferson's writings. Most prominent are the words inscribed around the monument near the roof: "I have sworn upon the altar of God eternal hostility against every form of tyranny over the mind of man."

In October 2021, in response to lobbying by activists, the New York City Public Design Commission voted unanimously to remove a statue of the former president from the New York City Council chamber where it had stood for more than a century. The statue was taken down in November 2021.

Writings

 A Summary View of the Rights of British America (1774)
 Declaration of the Causes and Necessity of Taking Up Arms (1775)
  Declaration of Independence (1776)
 Memorandums taken on a journey from Paris into the southern parts of France and Northern Italy, in the year 1787
 Notes on the State of Virginia (1781)
 Plan for Establishing Uniformity in the Coinage, Weights, and Measures of the United States A report submitted to Congress (1790)
 "An Essay Towards Facilitating Instruction in the Anglo-Saxon and Modern Dialects of the English Language" (1796)
 Manual of Parliamentary Practice for the Use of the Senate of the United States (1801)
 Autobiography (1821)
 Jefferson Bible, or The Life and Morals of Jesus of Nazareth

See also
 List of presidents of the United States
 List of presidents of the United States by previous experience
 List of presidents of the United States who owned slaves
 Declaration of independence
 United States Declaration of Independence
 Memorial to the 56 Signers of the Declaration of Independence
 Founders Online
 List of abolitionist forerunners
 Jefferson Monroe Levy
 Clotel or The President's Daughter, an 1853 novel by William Wells Brown
 Seconds pendulum

Notes

References

Bibliography

Scholarly studies

 
 
 
 
 Andrews, Stuart. "Thomas Jefferson and the French Revolution" History Today (May 1968), Vol. 18 Issue 5, pp. 299–306.
 

 
 
 Banning, Lance. The Jeffersonian persuasion: evolution of a party ideology (1978) online
 
 
 
 
 
 
 
 
 
 
 
 
 

 
 
 
 
 
 
 
 
 
 
  online free
 
 
 
 
 
 
 
 
 
 
 
 
 
 Gish, Dustin, and Daniel Klinghard. Thomas Jefferson and the Science of Republican Government: A Political Biography of Notes on the State of Virginia (Cambridge University Press, 2017) excerpt.
 
 
 
 
 ; online review
 
 
 
 
 
 
 
 
 
 
 
 
 
 
 
 
 
 
 
 
 
 
 
 Malone, Dumas. Jefferson (6 vol. 1948–1981)
 , Ebook

Thomas Jefferson Foundation sources
Thomas Jefferson Foundation (Main page and site-search)

Primary sources

 The Papers of Thomas Jefferson,  – the Princeton University Press edition of the correspondence and papers; vol 1 appeared in 1950; vol 41 (covering part of 1803) appeared in 2014.
 "Founders Online," searchable edition
 
 
 
 
  (Note: This was Jefferson's only book; numerous editions)

Web site sources

Teaching methods

External links

 Scholarly coverage of Jefferson at Miller Center, U of Virginia 
 
 Thomas Jefferson Papers: An Electronic Archive at the Massachusetts Historical Society
 Thomas Jefferson collection at the University of Virginia Library
 The Papers of Thomas Jefferson, subset of Founders Online from the National Archives
 
 The Thomas Jefferson Hour, a radio show about all things Thomas Jefferson The Thomas Jefferson Hour
 
 
 
 
 
 

 
Founding Fathers of the United States
1743 births
1826 deaths
18th-century American philosophers
18th-century vice presidents of the United States
18th-century American writers
19th-century American philosophers
19th-century vice presidents of the United States
19th-century presidents of the United States
Ambassadors of the United States to France
American architects
American book and manuscript collectors
American colonization movement
American deists
American foreign policy writers
American gardeners
American inventors
American lawyers admitted to the practice of law by reading law
American male non-fiction writers
American neoclassical architects
American people of English descent
American people of Welsh descent
American planters
American political party founders
American political philosophers
American political writers
American religious skeptics
American slave owners
American surveyors
Burials at Monticello
Candidates in the 1792 United States presidential election
Candidates in the 1796 United States presidential election
Candidates in the 1800 United States presidential election
Candidates in the 1804 United States presidential election
College of William & Mary alumni
Continental Congressmen from Virginia
Democratic-Republican Party presidents of the United States
Democratic-Republican Party vice presidents of the United States
Enlightenment philosophers
Fellows of the American Academy of Arts and Sciences
Free speech activists
Governors of Virginia
Hall of Fame for Great Americans inductees
1800s in the United States
House of Burgesses members
Independent scientists
Thomas
Members of the American Antiquarian Society
Members of the American Philosophical Society
Members of the Royal Netherlands Academy of Arts and Sciences
Members of the Virginia House of Delegates
People from Monticello
People of the American Enlightenment
Philosophers from Virginia
Physiocrats
Pre-19th-century cryptographers
Presidents of the United States
Randolph family of Virginia
Signers of the United States Declaration of Independence
United States Secretaries of State
University and college founders
University of Virginia people
Vice presidents of the United States
Virginia colonial people
Virginia Democratic-Republicans
Virginia lawyers
Washington administration cabinet members
Writers from Virginia
Writers of American Southern literature
Recipients of the AIA Gold Medal
Virginia dynasty
19th-century letter writers
American letter writers